The East is an Indonesian situation comedy programme that aired on NET. The title is named as "The East" for the namesake of the building where the headquarters of NET. is located in Jakarta, Indonesia.

Premise
The series depicts the situation behind the scenes of the station's in-house infotainment program called Entertainment News as well as the personal situation of its crew.  The talents involved here portray those who prepare the program, such as its Executive Producer, Producer, Creative, Production Assistant, reporter, and camera person. and lastly, the hosts who present the Entertainment News program.

Continuity
The sitcom reached 420th episodes just before the celebration of Eid Mubarak 2019. However, after that, the production of the sitcom has come to a halt. Until July 2019, it has been one month since they released the 420th episode. Still, there is no clear confirmation whether this sitcom is come to an end or will resume production.

Characters
The program is set to show the production process of the Entertainment News (E-News) program, where there are presenters for the show, those who work behind the scenes, and managerial positions who supervise talents and the progress of the show. Both are also the presenter of the real Entertainment News program alongside Gista Putri. Other presenters sometimes fill-in for the show.

Presenters
Shafira Umm as Shafira, the female presenter of E-News. She is cheerful, confident, and fashionable.
Caesar Gunawan as Caesar, the male presenter of E-News who boasts himself for being "the most handsome guy" on the show.
Aubry Beer as Aubry, the fellow female presenter of E-News. She is bright, pretty and full of passion.

Behind the scenes
Gista Putri as Gista, the producer of E-News and later on, 86. She sometimes fills in as the presenter for E-News. Hygienic and organized, she usually turns down Andika's affection and gets irritated by Mutia. Gista would later become an executive producer replacing Mutia position.
Sahira Anjani as Iren, the junior reporter who often goes out to report with Fajar and who briefs the presenters about the stories for the day's broadcast. Innocent and sometimes clumsy, she is always bullied by Fajar by asking for money and is called on by Mutia and Andika as being incompetent, but always finds consolation to Putri and unbeknownst to anyone, have martial art skills.
Tanta Ginting as Fajar, a cameraman who is the enemy of the crew for frequently asking for money, boastful, and sleeping on the job. He primarily bullies Iren and Andika by owing them plenty of money which he always promises to pay back at a later date. He does not work under supervision of Dhewo because he is often called to shoot for other programs.

Managerial positions
Sutan Simatupang as Dhewo, the Head of Production Department. Short tempered and loud, he is in charge of every single crew of all shows. He is in love with Mutia but fails to ask her for a date on all but one occasion, as well as unwillingly say a word of his affection for her.
Dwi Sasono as Dwi, the Head of Production Departement (Season 2). A calm and slow talking guy. Some of his employees sought him as a charismatic person who can lead the team and gets the job done.
Verdi Solaiman as Verdi, the Head of Production Departement (Season 3). A very experienced person who has been working in the TV industry for years especially abroad in South Korea. He's very strict to schedule who also apparently had an OCD (a disorder that requires his states of mind to had a perfectly lined object or we could say neatly placed).
Lukman Sardi as Lukman, the director who is stern but more tight-lipped and philosophical, thus often misunderstood by Dhewo. His favorite catchphrase is "Zero mistakes!"
Julie Estelle as Claudia, the Head Division of Talent Management. Artists who come to the TV station to try their luck of landing a gig must see her to make an appointment for casting. She is known for eating healthily and being likable.
Veronica Jalah Laissti Timuran as Laissti, the Director Assistant who works as the secretary for Lukman. Also in real life is the Personal Assistant to the NET. ex-CEO Wishnutama.

Crews

Season 1
Tara Basro as Mutia, the executive producer who handles the program on the set. Very stern and straightforward, a few of her colleagues are often irritated because of her attitude. She always unwittingly turns down Dhewo's offer for a night out. In the early episodes, Iren often follows her and writes down about how not to pester her when she gets pissed with Iren for doing so.
Ge Pamungkas as Andika, an assistant producer whose job description includes booking equipments for outdoor reporting and checking on footages for the broadcast. Clumsy and a bootlicker, he has a deep affection for Gista and a deep friendship with Fajar, both of which often put him on the losing side. The only positive side on him is frequently contributing applicable ideas for the show.
Ayushita as Putri, the creative and senior reporter who has the contact number of most prospective artists for interview. Calm, cheerful, and stylish, she is Gista and Iren's best friend.

Season 2
Karina Salim as Karin, executive producer for Ini Talkshow. She's very disciplined and competitive and considered as frenemy to Gista.
Achmad Megantara as Bima, executive producer for Tonight Show. A handsome guy in the office but sometimes also clumsy and takes advantage of girls in the office who admired him. Bima grew wiser and calmer in later episodes.
Adinda Thomas as Vira, also a part of Gista's creative team. A cheerful individual but also clumsy and had sensitive feelings about everything. She had a crush on Fajar, the camera guy.
Twindy Rarasati as Clarissa, a smart, motivated and well-prepared individual. She's the part of Karin's creative team.
Fajar Nugraha as Tomo, a production assistant replacing Bebi who have been moved to a different creative team. Tomo had special feelings to Vira who later they become a close friend.

Season 3
Ardhit Erwandha as Adit, production assistant to Gista (Season 3). He gets the jobs done but sometimes can be distracted especially when Clarissa is around.
Dea Rizkita as Dea, a junior production assistant to Karin. She always had something with makeups and online shopping. Sometimes she forgot her responsibility and tasks because of that.

Other casts
These casts are usually labeled as "Featuring" on the opening credit and is slated to play in multiple episodes.
Ferry Gustian as Eman (Office Boy) (Episodes 1–8)
Adhry Budiarsha as Ikin (Office Boy) (From Episode 9). He chuckles a lot and inadvertently interrupts Dhewo's pick-up line for Mutia while delivering his coffee.
Scott Leonard as Marcel, the temporary production assistant while Andika is on leave.
Samuel Rizal as Jose, another camera person who is adored by Iren.
Laura Theux as Bebi, a new intern who unwittingly has a feeling for Andika.
Ridwan Remin as Sobirin (Office Boy) (Episodes 400-now)

Special Guest Star
 Mathias Muchus
 Dian Sastrowardoyo
 Yuki Kato
 Brandon Nicholas Salim
 Boy William
 Sophia Latjuba
 Sheryl Sheinafia
 Wulan Guritno
 Nunung
 Baim Wong
 Julie Estelle
 Jill Gladys
 Restu Sinaga
 Chef Aiko
 DJ Yasmin
 Gisella Anastasia
 AKP Torsiadi Jamal
 Brigadir Dara Intan
 Brigadir Eka Frestya
 Putri Titian
 Winky Wiryawan
 Nadia Vega
 Pevita Pearce
 Armand Maulana
 Wishnutama
 Rio Dewanto
 Tasya Kamila
 Tina Toon
 Chiquita Meidy
 Prisia Nasution
 Seto Mulyadi
 Hedy Yunus
 Atiqah Hasiholan
 Isyana Sarasvati
 Kombespol Istiono
 Iptu Indra Putra
 Brigadir Herlina Swandi
 Sarah Sechan
 Kirana Larasati
 Budi Doremi
 Nirina Zubir
 Samuel Rizal
 Tora Sudiro
 Melly Goeslaw & Anto Hoed
 Cherrybelle
 Barli Asmara
 Tarra Budiman
 Kelas International Cast
 Sule
 Andre Taulany
 Mang Saswi
 Desta
 Vincent Ryan Rompies
 Imam Darto
 Dimas Danang
 Twinda Rarasati
 Shinta Naomi
 Temmy Rahadi
 Caesar Gunawan
 Garindra Bimo
 Maria Sabta
 Shafira Umm
 Deva Mahendra
 Aubry Beer
 Sita Nursanti
 Adinda Thomas
 Sheila Dara Aisha
 Paramitha Rusady

Episodes
Unless otherwise stated, any special guests on each episode are acting as themselves, usually as the interviewee for the day's report.
Season 1

External links
 

2015 Indonesian television series debuts
Indonesian comedy television series
Television series about television
NET (Indonesian TV network) original programming